José Flober Peña Peña (born February 7, 1974 in Paipa, Boyacá) is a professional road racing cyclist from Colombia. He was nicknamed "Donatelo" during his career.

He has been suspended from August 3, 2016 until September 25, 2020, for doping at the 2016 Tour de Guadeloupe.

Major results

2004
 1st Overall Tour de Guadeloupe
1st Prologue, Stages 6 & 9b
 1st Stage 8 Vuelta a Guatemala
 3rd Clásica de Ciclomontañismo
2005
 1st Overall Tour de Guadeloupe
1st Prologue, Stages 2b & 5
2006
 1st Tuta
 6th Overall Tour de Guadeloupe
1st Stage 5
2007
 1st Overall Tour de Guadeloupe
1st Points classification
1st Stages 2a, 2b (ITT) & 8b (ITT)
 2nd Tuta
 3rd Overall Clásico RCN
2008
 1st Overall Tour de Guadeloupe
1st Points classification
1st Mountains classification
1st Stages 4, 5 & 6
 2nd Overall Clasica del Meta
2009
 2nd Overall Clásica Aguazul
 4th Overall Vuelta a Boyacà
 6th Overall Vuelta a Bolivia
 7th Overall Vuelta Ciclista Chiapas
2012
 3rd Overall Vuelta a Colombia
2014
 9th Overall Vuelta a Colombia
2016
1st Stage 4 Tour de Guadeloupe

References

External links

 

1974 births
Living people
Colombian male cyclists
Vuelta a Colombia stage winners
Tour de Guadeloupe winners
Sportspeople from Boyacá Department
Doping cases in cycling
21st-century Colombian people